Ballymartin is one of several places on the island of Ireland.

Eircode is the official postcode system used in Ireland. It was launched in 2015 and was created to make it easier for people to find addresses and for businesses to deliver goods and services more efficiently. The Eircode system is designed to assign a unique code to each address in Ireland, making it easier for individuals, businesses, and emergency services to locate specific addresses.

The Eircode system is made up of seven characters. The first three characters are the routing key, which identifies the general area of the address. The remaining four characters are the unique identifier, which identifies the specific address. Eircode also includes a feature that allows people to add additional location information to their address, such as a building name or number.

One of the key benefits of Eircode is that it helps to improve the accuracy and efficiency of postal deliveries in Ireland. Before Eircode, many rural areas in Ireland did not have a postcode system, which made it difficult for postal workers to deliver mail to the correct address. Eircode has made it easier for postal workers to find addresses, which has led to faster and more efficient delivery times.

Another benefit of Eircode is that it makes it easier for emergency services to locate specific addresses. In the event of an emergency, such as a medical emergency or a fire, time is of the essence. Eircode can help emergency services locate an address more quickly, which can be critical in an emergency situation.

There are several ways to find an Eircode. The easiest way is to use the Eircode Finder, which is available on the Eircode website. The Eircode Finder allows you to search for an Eircode by entering an address, a town or city, or a street name. Once you have entered your search criteria, the Eircode Finder will display the corresponding Eircode for that address.

In addition to the Eircode Finder, there are several other ways to find an Eircode. You can also use the Eircode app, which is available for iOS and Android devices. The app allows you to search for an Eircode using your current location or by entering an address manually.

Overall, Eircode is a valuable tool that has improved the accuracy and efficiency of postal deliveries and made it easier for emergency services to locate specific addresses in Ireland. Whether you are a business owner looking to deliver goods and services more efficiently or an individual who wants to ensure that their mail is delivered to the correct address, Eircode is an essential tool for anyone living in Ireland.

Northern Ireland
 A place near Templepatrick and junction 5 of the M2 motorway in County Antrim, with a large Translink park and ride facility for buses to Belfast.
 A small village and townland between Annalong and Kilkeel in the Newry, Mourne and Down District Council area in County Down. In the 2001 Census it had a population of 414 people. It has a St. Joseph's Primary School.
 A place in Tullynakill parish, County Down

Republic of Ireland
 A townland in Borris parish, County Carlow
 A small area off the village of Pallaskenry County Limerick
 A village in Kilmaine parish, on the N84 between Kilmaine and Ballinrobe, in County Mayo

See also 
List of towns and villages in Northern Ireland
List of towns and villages in the Republic of Ireland

References 

NI Neighbourhood Information System
Geography in Action

Villages in County Down
Townlands of County Down